USA-190, also known as GPS IIR-15(M), GPS IIRM-2 and GPS SVN-52, is an American navigation satellite which forms part of the Global Positioning System. It was the second of eight Block IIRM satellites to be launched, and the fifteenth of twenty one Block IIR satellites overall. It was built by Lockheed Martin, using the AS-4000 satellite bus.

USA-190 was launched at 18:50 UTC on 25 September 2006, atop a Delta II carrier rocket, flight number D318, flying in the 7925-9.5 configuration. The launch took place from Space Launch Complex 17A at the Cape Canaveral Air Force Station, and placed USA-190 into a transfer orbit. The satellite raised itself into medium Earth orbit using a Star-37FM apogee motor.

It is used to broadcast the PRN 31 signal, and operates in slot 2 of plane A of the GPS constellation. As of 2012 it remains in service.

References

Spacecraft launched in 2006
GPS satellites
USA satellites